Operation Twilight was a British record label, the UK branch of Belgian label Les Disques du Crépuscule. It was run by Patrick Moore, who now writes as Philip Hoare.

Moore was working for Rough Trade Records at the time, and described the genesis of Operation Twilight thus: "Geoff Travis [Rough Trade] and Michel Duval [Crépuscule] cooked up a plan in January 1982 where I would start up the UK equivalent of Les Disques du Crépuscule. Michel had a sort of James Bond idea about it — it would be the James Bond version of Crépuscule — Operation Twilight."

Operation Twilight closed in 1983, though most of the artists - including Paul Haig, Antena, Tuxedomoon, Thick Pigeon - would continue to release records on Les Disques du Crépuscule. The label is also noteworthy for launching the career of the Pale Fountains.

Discography 
This discography includes unreleased items that nevertheless were given a catalogue number.

References

External links 
 Operation Twilight (Frank Brinkhuis)
 The Last Summer Of Love (history of the label by Moore)

Record labels established in 1982
Record labels disestablished in 1983
British independent record labels
Alternative rock record labels
1982 establishments in the United Kingdom